Prionosciadium nelsonii is a plant species known from the Mexican states of Chiapas and Morelos. It is a biennial herb with a large taproot. Leaves are compound with narrowly lanecolate leaflets, some of them with narrow, tapering lobes. The inflorescence is a compound umbel at the top of the stem.

References

External links
photo of herbarium specimen at Missouri Botanical Garden, collected in Morelos, syntype of Prionosciadium nelsonii, sheet 1 of 2 w stem + flowers
photo of herbarium specimen at Missouri Botanical Garden, collected in Morelos, syntype of Prionosciadium nelsonii, sheet 2 of 2 w fruits + basal leaf

Apioideae
Endemic flora of Mexico
Flora of Chiapas
Flora of Morelos
Plants described in 1900
Taxa named by John Merle Coulter